Jörg Sasse (born 1962) is a German photographer. His work uses found images that are scanned, pixelated and manipulated.

In 2003 Sasse won the Cologne Fine Art Award and in 2005 was shortlisted for the Deutsche Börse Photography Foundation Prize. His work is held in the collections of the Belvedere, Fotomuseum Winterthur, Solomon R. Guggenheim Museum and the Städel.

Life and work
Sasse attended the Kunstakademie Düsseldorf from 1982 to 1988, where he studied under Bernd Becher. Since 1994 his work has involved digitally manipulating found images—primarily land- and cityscapes. "He developed a process of scanning images into his computer, changing them, and then making film negatives of these manipulated images, from which the final prints are made."

Publications

Books of work by Sasse
Vierzig Fotografien 1984 – 1991. Munich: Schirmer/Mosel, 1992. . With texts by Gerda Breuer and Thomas Lange.
Arbeiten am Bild. Kunsthalle Bremen; Munich: Schirmer/Mosel, 2001. . With texts by Sasse, Andreas Kreul and Detlef Bernhard Linke.
Tableaux & Esquisses. Museum of Grenoble; Munich: Schirmer/Mosel, 2004. . With a text by Guy Tosatto.
Tableaus & Skizzen 2004/2005, Kunstmuseum Bonn; Kunstverein Hannover; Munich: Schirmer/Mosel, 2005. . With texts by Stefan Gronert, Stephan Berg and Martin Engler.
Skizzen – Der Grenoble Block. Munich: Schirmer/Mosel, 2006. . 	  With texts by Sasse and Tosatto, in English, French, and German.
d8207. Cologne: Walther König, 2007. .

Publications with contributions by Sasse
The Düsseldorf School of Photography. New York: Aperture, 2010. Germany: Schirmer/Mosel, 2010. Edited by Stefan Gronert. Includes work by Bernd and Hilla Becher, Laurenz Berges, Elger Esser, Andreas Gursky, Candida Höfer, Axel Hütte, Simone Nieweg, Thomas Ruff, Sasse, Thomas Struth, and Petra Wunderlich; a foreword by Lothar Schirmer, an essay by Gronert, and summary biographies, exhibition lists and bibliographies for each of the photographers. .

Awards
2003: Cologne Fine Art Award, Art Cologne, Cologne, Germany
2005: Shortlisted, Deutsche Börse Photography Foundation Prize, The Photographers' Gallery, London

Collections
Sasse's work is held in the following public collections:
Belvedere, Vienna, Austria
Fotomuseum Winterthur, Winterthur, Switzerland: 2 prints (as of December 2020)
Solomon R. Guggenheim Museum, New York: 2 prints (as of December 2020)
Städel, Frankfurt, Germany: 6 prints (as of December 2020)

Films about Sasse
Skizzen und Tableaux (Buchhandlung König, 2017) – by Ralph Goertz; 34 minutes

References

Further reading
Serendipity. Vom Glück des Findes: Niklas Luhmann, Ulrich Rückriem, Jörg Sasse. Snoeck Verlagsges, 2015. By Michael Diers. . German-language.

External links

20th-century German photographers
21st-century German photographers
Kunstakademie Düsseldorf alumni
University of Duisburg-Essen alumni
People from Bad Salzuflen
Living people
1962 births